These are the official results of the Women's 1500 metres event at the 2003 IAAF World Championships in Paris, France. There were a total number of 32 participating athletes, with three qualifying heats, two semi-finals and the final held on Sunday 31 August 2003 at 18:20h.

Final

Semi-final
Held on Friday 29 August 2003

Heats
Held on Wednesday 27 August 2003

References
 

H
1500 metres at the World Athletics Championships
2003 in women's athletics